"The Magic of the Wizard's Dream" is the third single recorded by Italian symphonic power metal band Rhapsody, released in 2005. 

The title track was originally part of their 2004 album Symphony of Enchanted Lands II: The Dark Secret and is reproposed here in basically two versions: one with a slightly faster tempo and the album one. The faster version is sung by Fabio Lione, with Christopher Lee as a guest, in four different languages (English, Italian, French and German) plus an orchestral mix of the English one. 

Other songs include "Autumn Twilight", a fast-paced track, and "Lo Specchio d'Argento" ("The Silver Mirror") a power ballad with Italian lyrics.

Track listing

Release
An alternate release of the single exists, where tracks 3, 4, 5 and 7 are not present, replaced by "The Last Angels' Call" (from Symphony of Enchanted Lands II: The Dark Secret)

CD slim box single track list

Personnel 
Rhapsody of Fire
Fabio Lione – vocals
Luca Turilli – guitars
Alex Staropoli – keyboards
Alex Holzwarth – drums
Patrice Guers – bass guitar

Additional musicians
 Christopher Lee – vocals
 Manuel Staropoli – flute
 Dominique Leurquin – guitars

Bohuslav Martinů Philharmonic Orchestra

 Emil Nosek – violin
 František Hrubý – violin
 Hana Roušarová – violin
 Hana Tesařová – violin
 Jan Nedoma – violin
 Jana Štípková – violin
 Jitka Hanáková – violin
 Milan Lapka – violin
 Miroslav Křivánek – violin
 Přemysl Roušar – violin
 Dana Blahutová – violin
 Hana Bílková – violin
 Jan Kotulan – violin
 Jaroslav Aladzas – violin
 Jitka Šuranská – violin
 Josef Geryk – violin
 Josef Kubelka – violin
 Josef Vyžrálek – violin
 Leo Sláma – violin
 Yvona Fialová – violin
 Dana Božková – viola
 Juraj Petrovič – viola
 Lucie Dümlerová – viola
 Michaela Slámová – viola
 Miroslav Kašný – viola
 Oldřich Šebestík – viola
 Pavel Novák – viola
 Roman Janů – viola
 Alexandr Erml – celli
 David Kefer – celli
 Erich Hulín – celli
 Hana Škarpová – celli
 Zdenka Aladzasová – celli
 Zuzana Ermlová – celli
 Josef Horák – double bass
 Michal Pášma – double bass
 Pavel Juřík – double bass
 Vladimír Hudeček – double bass
 Vítězslav Pelikán – double bass
 Jana Holásková – flute
 Jiřina Vodičková – flute
 Vladimír Vodička – flute
 Krista Hallová – oboe
 Svatopluk Holásek – oboe
 Aleš Pavlorek – clarinet
 Jiří Kundl – clarinet
 Jaroslav Janoštík – bassoon
 Václav Kaniok – bassoon
 František Vyskočil – French horn
 Jiří Zatloukal – French horn
 Josef Číhal – French horn
 Milan Kubát – French horn
 Rudolf Linner – French horn
 Vlastimil Kelar – French horn
 Pavel Skopal – trumpet
 Rostislav Killar – trumpet
 Zdeněk Macek – trumpet
 Ivan Dřínovský – trombone
 Milan Tesař – trombone
 Roman Sklenář – trombone
 Miloslav Žváček – tuba
 Lucie Vápová – harp

Production
 Joey DeMaio – production
 Petr Pololáník – orchestra conductor

References

2005 singles
Rhapsody of Fire songs
2004 songs